George H. Clay (February 14, 1911 – October 11, 1995) was president of the Federal Reserve Bank of Kansas City from 1961 to 1976.

Life and career
Clay was born in Kansas City, Kansas, attended Kansas City Junior College, William Jewell College and received a law degree from the University of Missouri School of Law.

In 1944 he joined Trans World Airlines in Kansas City as an assistant director of state affairs and rose to become TWA's vice president of administrative services.  He played important roles in developing TWA's facilities at John F. Kennedy International Airport in New York City and establishing the Kansas City Overhaul Base that became the basis for Kansas City International Airport.

In 1958 he left TWA to become general counsel for the Kansas City Federal Reserve and became president in 1961.

References

1911 births
1995 deaths
20th-century American businesspeople
Federal Reserve Bank of Kansas City presidents
People from Kansas City, Kansas
Trans World Airlines people
University of Missouri School of Law alumni
William Jewell College alumni